Adventures of Casanova is a 1948 American-Mexican historical adventure film directed by Roberto Gavaldón and starring Arturo de Córdova Lucille Bremer and Turhan Bey. It portrays a fictional version of the story of Casanova, and was intended to capitalize on the success of the Errol Flynn film The Adventures of Don Juan which was released the same year after a long production process. It is set in Sicily in the 1790s, with Casanova as a freedom fighter battling against the King's local governor Count de Brissac, who unknown to the monarch, is acting as a tyrant.

The film's sets were designed by the art directors Jorge Fernandez and Alfred Ybarra

Cast
 Arturo de Córdova as Casanova  
 Lucille Bremer as Lady Bianca  
 Turhan Bey as Lorenzo  
 John Sutton as Count de Brissac  
 George Tobias as Jacopo  
 Noreen Nash as Zanetta  
 Lloyd Corrigan as D'Albernasi  
 Fritz Leiber as D'Anneci  
 Nestor Paiva as Prefecture police  
 Jorge Trevino as Angelino  
 Clifford Carr as Salvatore  
 Jacqueline Dalya as Lady Adria  
 Miroslava as Cassandra's sister 
 Rafael Alcayde as Cassandra's brother-in-law  
 Jacqueline Evans as Cassandra 
 Leonor Gómez as Woman in crowd 
 Chel López as Jailer 
 Rita Macedo as Bruntilla, maid  
 Charles Rooner as Palace guard  
 Fanny Schiller as Woman who complains in crowd  
 Fernando Wagner as Assassinated commander

References

Bibliography 
 Richards, Jeffrey. Swordsmen of the Screen: From Douglas Fairbanks to Michael York. Routledge, 2014.

External links 
 

1948 films
1940s historical adventure films
Mexican historical adventure films
American historical adventure films
Spanish-language American films
Films directed by Roberto Gavaldón
Films scored by Hugo Friedhofer
Films set in Sicily
Films set in the 1790s
Mexican black-and-white films
Films about Giacomo Casanova
Eagle-Lion Films films
American black-and-white films
1940s American films
1940s Mexican films